The Prokopyevsk constituency (No.102) is a Russian legislative constituency in Kemerovo Oblast. The oddly-shaped constituency until 2007 covered upstate southern Kemerovo Oblast, however, in 2015 redistricting it shedded southern Kemerovo Oblast to Novokuznetsk constituency and was stretched to Kemerovo.

Members elected

Election results

1993

|-
! colspan=2 style="background-color:#E9E9E9;text-align:left;vertical-align:top;" |Candidate
! style="background-color:#E9E9E9;text-align:left;vertical-align:top;" |Party
! style="background-color:#E9E9E9;text-align:right;" |Votes
! style="background-color:#E9E9E9;text-align:right;" |%
|-
|style="background-color:"|
|align=left|Nina Volkova
|align=left|Independent
|
|35.52%
|-
| colspan="5" style="background-color:#E9E9E9;"|
|- style="font-weight:bold"
| colspan="3" style="text-align:left;" | Total
| 
| 100%
|-
| colspan="5" style="background-color:#E9E9E9;"|
|- style="font-weight:bold"
| colspan="4" |Source:
|
|}

1995

|-
! colspan=2 style="background-color:#E9E9E9;text-align:left;vertical-align:top;" |Candidate
! style="background-color:#E9E9E9;text-align:left;vertical-align:top;" |Party
! style="background-color:#E9E9E9;text-align:right;" |Votes
! style="background-color:#E9E9E9;text-align:right;" |%
|-
|style="background-color:"|
|align=left|Nina Ostanina
|align=left|Independent
|
|45.24%
|-
|style="background-color:"|
|align=left|Vladimir Melnichenko
|align=left|Independent
|
|9.65%
|-
|style="background-color:"|
|align=left|Yevgeny Tuinov
|align=left|Liberal Democratic Party
|
|7.65%
|-
|style="background-color:"|
|align=left|Tatyana Ananyina
|align=left|Our Home – Russia
|
|6.61%
|-
|style="background-color:#FF4400"|
|align=left|Sayetgali Sharipov
|align=left|Party of Workers' Self-Government
|
|6.33%
|-
|style="background-color:"|
|align=left|Igor Litvenenko
|align=left|Independent
|
|3.92%
|-
|style="background-color:"|
|align=left|Mikhail Todyshev
|align=left|Revival
|
|3.80%
|-
|style="background-color:#DA2021"|
|align=left|Nina Volkova (incumbent)
|align=left|Ivan Rybkin Bloc
|
|3.77%
|-
|style="background-color:"|
|align=left|Ivan Shashviashvili
|align=left|Our Future
|
|1.34%
|-
|style="background-color:#000000"|
|colspan=2 |against all
|
|9.92%
|-
| colspan="5" style="background-color:#E9E9E9;"|
|- style="font-weight:bold"
| colspan="3" style="text-align:left;" | Total
| 
| 100%
|-
| colspan="5" style="background-color:#E9E9E9;"|
|- style="font-weight:bold"
| colspan="4" |Source:
|
|}

1999

|-
! colspan=2 style="background-color:#E9E9E9;text-align:left;vertical-align:top;" |Candidate
! style="background-color:#E9E9E9;text-align:left;vertical-align:top;" |Party
! style="background-color:#E9E9E9;text-align:right;" |Votes
! style="background-color:#E9E9E9;text-align:right;" |%
|-
|style="background-color:"|
|align=left|Nina Ostanina (incumbent)
|align=left|Communist Party
|
|77.00%
|-
|style="background:#1042A5"| 
|align=left|Tatyana Zemlyanskikh (Khudobina)
|align=left|Union of Right Forces
|
|11.98%
|-
|style="background:#FF4400"| 
|align=left|Mikhail Shchadov
|align=left|Andrey Nikolayev and Svyatoslav Fyodorov Bloc
|
|1.82%
|-
|style="background-color:"|
|align=left|Gary Nemchenko
|align=left|Our Home – Russia
|
|1.68%
|-
|style="background-color:#000000"|
|colspan=2 |against all
|
|6.21%
|-
| colspan="5" style="background-color:#E9E9E9;"|
|- style="font-weight:bold"
| colspan="3" style="text-align:left;" | Total
| 
| 100%
|-
| colspan="5" style="background-color:#E9E9E9;"|
|- style="font-weight:bold"
| colspan="4" |Source:
|
|}

2003

|-
! colspan=2 style="background-color:#E9E9E9;text-align:left;vertical-align:top;" |Candidate
! style="background-color:#E9E9E9;text-align:left;vertical-align:top;" |Party
! style="background-color:#E9E9E9;text-align:right;" |Votes
! style="background-color:#E9E9E9;text-align:right;" |%
|-
|style="background-color:"|
|align=left|Nina Ostanina (incumbent)
|align=left|Communist Party
|
|72.98%
|-
|style="background-color:"|
|align=left|Vladislav Balovnev
|align=left|Independent
|
|7.71%
|-
|style="background-color:"|
|align=left|Vladimir Ovsyannikov
|align=left|Liberal Democratic Party
|
|6.76%
|-
|style="background-color:#164C8C"|
|align=left|Vladimir Surodin
|align=left|United Russian Party Rus'
|
|1.88%
|-
|style="background-color:#000000"|
|colspan=2 |against all
|
|9.26%
|-
| colspan="5" style="background-color:#E9E9E9;"|
|- style="font-weight:bold"
| colspan="3" style="text-align:left;" | Total
| 
| 100%
|-
| colspan="5" style="background-color:#E9E9E9;"|
|- style="font-weight:bold"
| colspan="4" |Source:
|
|}

2016

|-
! colspan=2 style="background-color:#E9E9E9;text-align:left;vertical-align:top;" |Candidate
! style="background-color:#E9E9E9;text-align:left;vertical-align:top;" |Party
! style="background-color:#E9E9E9;text-align:right;" |Votes
! style="background-color:#E9E9E9;text-align:right;" |%
|-
|style="background-color: " |
|align=left|Dmitry Islamov
|align=left|United Russia
|
|77.28%
|-
|style="background-color:"|
|align=left|Maksim Parshukov
|align=left|Liberal Democratic Party
|
|7.22%
|-
|style="background-color:"|
|align=left|Vladimir Karpov
|align=left|Communist Party
|
|6.04%
|-
|style="background-color:"|
|align=left|Nikolay Ryzhak
|align=left|A Just Russia
|
|4.96%
|-
|style="background:"| 
|align=left|Olga Bondareva
|align=left|Communists of Russia
|
|2.10%
|-
|style="background:"| 
|align=left|Vitaly Ilyin
|align=left|Yabloko
|
|1.55%
|-
| colspan="5" style="background-color:#E9E9E9;"|
|- style="font-weight:bold"
| colspan="3" style="text-align:left;" | Total
| 
| 100%
|-
| colspan="5" style="background-color:#E9E9E9;"|
|- style="font-weight:bold"
| colspan="4" |Source:
|
|}

2021

|-
! colspan=2 style="background-color:#E9E9E9;text-align:left;vertical-align:top;" |Candidate
! style="background-color:#E9E9E9;text-align:left;vertical-align:top;" |Party
! style="background-color:#E9E9E9;text-align:right;" |Votes
! style="background-color:#E9E9E9;text-align:right;" |%
|-
|style="background-color:"|
|align=left|Dmitry Islamov (incumbent)
|align=left|United Russia
|
|71.11%
|-
|style="background-color:"|
|align=left|Ivan Utrobin
|align=left|Communist Party
|
|5.64%
|-
|style="background-color:"|
|align=left|Vladimir Pronin
|align=left|A Just Russia — For Truth
|
|5.30%
|-
|style="background-color:"|
|align=left|Kirill Pravdin
|align=left|Liberal Democratic Party
|
|4.87%
|-
|style="background:"| 
|align=left|Afanasy Yeremkin
|align=left|Communists of Russia
|
|3.67%
|-
|style="background-color: " |
|align=left|Maksim Smirnov
|align=left|New People
|
|2.20%
|-
|style="background-color:"|
|align=left|Yelena Matveyeva
|align=left|The Greens
|
|1.97%
|-
|style="background-color: "|
|align=left|Yevgeny Zheltkevich
|align=left|Party of Pensioners
|
|1.60%
|-
|style="background-color:"|
|align=left|Artyom Matveyev
|align=left|Rodina
|
|1.20%
|-
| colspan="5" style="background-color:#E9E9E9;"|
|- style="font-weight:bold"
| colspan="3" style="text-align:left;" | Total
| 
| 100%
|-
| colspan="5" style="background-color:#E9E9E9;"|
|- style="font-weight:bold"
| colspan="4" |Source:
|
|}

Notes

References

Russian legislative constituencies
Politics of Kemerovo Oblast